Lábios sem Beijos (Virgin Lips or Lips without Kisses) is a Brazilian dramatic film produced in 1930 by Cinédia, in the era of silent cinema. It was directed by Humberto Mauro, who was also the cinematographer, with Lelita Rosa, Paulo Morano and Didi Viana in the main cast. Written by Adhemar Gonzaga and Arlindo Muccilo, the film tells the story of Lelita, a young woman from a wealthy family who is courted by her cousin Paul, but she has reason to believe that he is also having an affair with Lelita's sister, which causes problems of jealousy, until everything becomes clear and true love prevails.

In an interview with the Brazilian magazine A Ordem during the period prior to the film's release, Gonzaga stated:

"My company was founded to build true Brazilian cinema. It was launched exclusively with our effort and our capitals. Let us show that we can create a new and legitimate art, capable of turning the smile of the pessimists into a cry of enthusiasm. "

Reception
The first film from Cinédia, it is regarded as among Mauro's most significant films, and a classic of Brazilian silent film. It has been described as "a landmark in Brazilian comic film... a biting take on daily life, an ironic vision ... that still makes us laugh today". Some contemporary critics objected to its sensual imagery.

It won the 1930 Journal do Brasil award for Best Brazilian Film.

References

External links 
  (IMDB)
 Virgin Lips Adorocinema
 Virgin Lips Cinemateca

1930 drama films
1930 films
Brazilian black-and-white films
Brazilian drama films
Films directed by Humberto Mauro
1930s Portuguese-language films